New Jersey's largest record label, Bar/None Records, began in 1986 by releasing albums from artists native to the Hoboken region of New Jersey. NPR's radio program World Cafe recognizes Bar/None Records as being "small but influential," in comparison with multinational media groups, listing artists that first recorded with the label before signing with larger record labels, such as Ezra Furman, Freedy Johnston, Yo La Tengo, the Front Bottoms, the Feelies and They Might Be Giants. As of 2019, there have been over one-hundred and twenty artists signed to Bar/None Records.

Artists

Former and inactive artists

References
Citations

Bibliography

External links
Full catalog of Bar/None Records artists at bar-none.com

Bar None Records